Visual technology is the engineering discipline dealing with visual representation.

Types
Visual technology includes photography, printing, augmented reality, virtual reality and video.

See also

Audiovisual
Audiovisual education
Information and communications technology
Medical imaging
Multimedia
Technology
Visual arts
Visual culture
Visual perception
Visual sociology

References

Works cited

Multimedia
Visual perception